Argyresthia thuiella, the arborvitae leafminer, thuja mining moth or American thuja shoot moth, is a moth of the family Yponomeutidae. It is found in southeastern Canada and the northeastern United States to North Carolina, west to Missouri, north to Manitoba. There is also an isolated population in British Columbia. The species is also present in Europe, where it has been introduced on three occasions: to the Netherlands in 1971, Germany in 1975 and Austria in 1976.

The wingspan is about 8 mm. Adults are on wing from May to July depending on the location.

The larvae feed on the leaves of Thuja occidentalis as well as other arborvitae and false cypress (Chamaecyparis) species. Trees infested for several consecutive years can be killed, but usually an infested tree is able to renew foliage later during the growth season.

References

External links
Bug Guide

Moths described in 1871
Argyresthia
Moths of North America
Moths of Europe